Alan Dean is a British tattoo artist and owner of three Tattoo UK studios in the London area. Dean has been tattooing for over 25 years and his studios are one of the leading studios in the UK. His studios are internationally recognised and he is a popular attendee and sponsor of many of the worlds Tattoo Conventions including Mexico, Tattoo Jam, Derby, Tattoo Freeze.

Tattoo UK first opened their Rayners Lane store in 2001 and due to the increased demand a new studio was opened in Uxbridge.
After a few years of business and an increase in customer base, Dean opened a studio in Twickenham. The studio opened on 23 July 2011 and in now classed as the Flagship studio. Matt Hugill is the Head Tattoo Artist at Tattoo UK and is based at the new Twickenham store.

Many celebrities have had tattoo work done at Tattoo UK including Amy Winehouse, McFly and a member of British girl band Sugababes.
Tattoo UK and Alan Dean are both award winners. They were also involved in the Guinness world record for Simultaneous People Tattooed at Tattoo Jam in Doncaster, England.

References

External links 
 

Year of birth missing (living people)
Living people
People from Harrow, London
British tattoo artists
Place of birth missing (living people)